Brahim Boudebouda (born 28 August 1990 in Algiers) is an Algerian footballer who current plays as a left back for Algerian Ligue 2 club RC Kouba.

Club career

MC Alger
On 25 February 2008 Boudebouda, just 17 years old at the time, made his professional debut for MC Alger in the local derby against USM Alger in Koléa, coming on as a substitute for Smaïl Chaoui in the 63rd minute. MC Alger went on to win the game 1–0.

In the 2009–2010 season, Boudebouda made 16 appearances and scored 2 goals for MC Alger as they won the league title for the first time since 1999.

On 3 April 2011 Boudebouda helped MC Alger qualify to the second round of the 2011 CAF Champions League with two goals in a 3–0 win against Zimbabwean side Dynamos F.C. He was decisive again in the second round, with an 89th-minute winner against Inter Luanda of Angola, as MC Alger won 3–2 and advanced to the group stage.

On 10 May 2011 Boudebouda went on trial with Belgian side Germinal Beerschot.

Le Mans FC
On 3 July 2011 it was announced that Boudebouda would be joining French Ligue 2 side Le Mans FC after agreeing to a three-year contract. On 6 July 2011 the move was made official. On 9 August 2011 Bedbouda made his debut for the club as a starter in a 2011–12 Coupe de la Ligue match against Istres. He played the entire match as Le Mans won 2–0. On 12 June 2012 Boudebouda reached a mutual agreement with Le Mans to terminate his contract.

USM Alger
On 13 June 2012, one day after terminating his contract with Le Mans, Boudebouda signed a two-year contract with USM Alger.

Statistics

International career
He was member of the team at the 2010 UNAF U-23 Tournament in Morocco, where the team finished first. Boudebouda scored a goal in the final group game against Libya.

Honours

Club
 USM Alger
 Algerian Ligue Professionnelle 1 (2): 2013-14, 2015-16
 Algerian Cup (1): 2013
 Algerian Super Cup (1): 2013
 UAFA Club Cup (1): 2013

 MC Alger
 Algerian Ligue Professionnelle 1 (1): 2009-10
 Algerian Super Cup (1): 2007

References

External links
 DZFoot Profile
 

1990 births
Living people
Footballers from Algiers
Algerian footballers
Algerian expatriate footballers
Algerian Ligue Professionnelle 1 players
Algeria under-23 international footballers
Algeria youth international footballers
Expatriate footballers in France
MC Alger players
Le Mans FC players
MC Oran players
Ligue 2 players
Algerian expatriate sportspeople in France
USM Alger players
Algeria A' international footballers
Algeria international footballers
Association football fullbacks
21st-century Algerian people